Jonas Reingold (born 22 April 1969) is a Swedish bass guitarist from Malmö.

Biography
Reingold started to play bass in 1986 when he subbed for a friend in the local famous act WIRE. The band was happy with his performance and offered him the spot. From 1988 until 1994, he studied music and achieved a master's degree of fine arts in 1994.

Busy working as a session player between 1994 and 1996 he finally released his debut album as a band leader in 1995, which was called Sweden Bass Orchestra. It was a bass big band consisting of 5 bass players and a drummer. They also had a guest performance by Niels-Henning Ørsted Pedersen on the disc. Between 1996 and 1999, Reingold was busy recording with various artists and different projects, such as Midnight Sun, Reingold, Sand and Gold and others.

Reingold has also been contributed to songwriting for the Swedish metal group The Poodles. He has been credited for one song on each of their albums thus far (except for Sweet Trade for which he co-wrote three tracks). He has co-written: "Metal Will Stand Tall", "Streets of Fire", "Seven Seas", "Reach the Sky", "I Rule the Night" and "Father to a Son" with them. Most of his contributions has become some of the most recognized songs by the band.

In 1999 he started to work with The Flower Kings, replacing Michael Stolt who moved on to other projects, and has remained a permanent member in the group. Currently, he is involved with the Kings, Opus Atlantica, Time Requiem, Kaipa and his own band: Karmakanic. Reingold was also a member of the international progressive rock band, The Tangent.

Reingold played bass as special guest on the Musea/Colossus release: Dante's Inferno with a Hungarian progressive rock band called Yesterdays. This concept CD was released in December 2008.

Reingold also played bass on An Endless Sporadic's self-titled full-length album An Endless Sporadic which was produced by long-time collaborator Roine Stolt of The Flower Kings and Transatlantic.

In 2017, Reingold co-formed the supergroup The Sea Within and released a self-titled debut album in June 2018.

Reingold has been touring with Steve Hackett since 2019 on his UK, European and North American tours.

References

External links 
 Official website
 Jonas Reingold A fan made website with extensive discography of Jonas.
 ReingoldRecords Jonas' production website and record label

1969 births
Living people
Swedish heavy metal bass guitarists
Musicians from Malmö
Kaipa members
The Tangent members
The Flower Kings members